Dany Priso (born 2 January 1994) is a French rugby union player. His position is prop and he currently plays for Toulon in the Top 14. He began his career at Stade Français.

International career
Priso was called up to the French national team for the first time ahead of France's opening 2018 Six Nations Championship match against Ireland. He made his debut in that game coming on for Jefferson Poirot in the 55th minute of an eventual 13–15 home loss.

Personal life
Priso was born in Cameroon and moved to France when he was 11 years old. Originally interested in football, he eventually grew an interest for rugby after going to see a rugby practice in the park next to his house in Ussel.

Honours

Club 
 La Rochelle
 European Rugby Champions Cup: 2021–22

References

External links
France profile at FFR
Stade Rochelais profile

1994 births
Living people
French rugby union players
Cameroonian rugby union players
Cameroonian emigrants to France
Stade Français players
Stade Rochelais players
RC Toulonnais players
Rugby union props
France international rugby union players